Taishan Guihe is a station on the Taoyuan Airport MRT located in Taishan District, New Taipei, Taiwan.

Station overview
This elevated station has two side platform. It opened for trial service on 2 February 2017, and for commercial service 2 March 2017.

The name of the station is derived from its location: Taishan District, Guihe Village (when the station was named the location was Taishan Township, Guihe Village.)

History
 2017-03-02: The station opened for commercial service with the opening of the Taipei-Huanbei section of the Airport MRT.

Around the station
 Ming Chi University of Technology

References

2017 establishments in Taiwan
Railway stations opened in 2017
Taoyuan Airport MRT stations
Transportation in New Taipei
Buildings and structures in New Taipei